Michelle Madrigal Gaspar (born November 4, 1988) is a Filipino-American former actress. She was a finalist of ABS-CBN reality talent search, Star Circle Quest. She has a younger sister named Micaella Madrigal and her elder sister, Ehra Madrigal is also an actress.

Career
Michelle was a former contract star at ABS-CBN's Star Magic, where she started when she joined the reality talent search Star Circle Quest in 2004. Thereafter, she was cast in several TV shows in the network, particularly in the youth-oriented drama SCQ Reload and the fantasy horror series Spirits along with Vietnam Rose, Crazy for You, Maging Sino Ka Man and Sineserye Presents: May Minamahal.

In 2007, Annabelle Rama took her under her wing as her manager. She transferred to GMA Network along with her older sister Ehra Madrigal. Michelle and Ehra were both cover girls of FHM for the same month of September but in different years. She was one of the casts of the two fantasy drama series Kamandag and Dyesebel, via GMA Network, in where she played a villainess. Recently, she is included in the cast of Luna Mystika as one of the fairies (other being Pauleen Luna).

Recently, Michelle played Juana Manalo In Zorro and she will include in Sine Novela: Tinik sa Dibdib which stars Sunshine Dizon (later Nadine Samonte) as Lorna Yadao-Domingo, where she played the only crazy but humble sister in law of Trixie (Ara Mina, later Rita (Sheryl Cruz) Moret or Corazon Domingo.

In 2015, Madrigal returned to ABS-CBN and appeared in Pasión de Amor (based on Pasión de Gavilanes, produced by Telemundo), co-starring Jake Cuenca, Arci Muñoz, Ejay Falcon, Ellen Adarna, Joseph Marco and Coleen Garcia. Michelle and her sister Ehra are now talents of Viva Artist Agency since 2015, while in 2016 the supporting roles with Rodessa in the TV series Born for You, and the supporting and last appearances as SPO3 Sunshine Monteloyola in Ang Probinsyano.

Personal life
On April 30, 2017, Madrigal announced through Instagram that she and her partner, Troy Woolfolk, had been expecting their first child for three months. She was expected to give birth by November 2017. In July 2017, Madrigal announced that she and Woolfolk became engaged. In August 2021, Michelle and her husband confirmed that they separated as they go through their divorce by posting on their respective Instagram accounts.

On February 12, 2022, Michelle confirmed that she took the oath to be a naturalized American citizen.

Filmography

Television

Movies

References

External links
 Michelle and Ehra Madrigal at the Philippine Star Supreme

1988 births
Living people
Filipino child actresses
Filipino film actresses
People from Quezon City
Actresses from Metro Manila
Filipino people of Spanish descent
Visayan people
Participants in Philippine reality television series
ABS-CBN personalities
Star Magic
Star Circle Quest participants
GMA Network personalities
Survivor Philippines contestants
Viva Artists Agency
Naturalized citizens of the United States